Edaikazhinadu is a panchayat town in Chengalpattu district  in the state of Tamil Nadu, India.
Edaikazhinadu was situated near villages Vennangupattu, Kadappakkam. Alamparai fort, a 17th century historical fort, is located in this region.

Demographics
 India census, Edakalinadu had a population of 25,769. Males constitute 49% of the population and females 51%. Edakalinadu has an average literacy rate of 60%, higher than the national average of 59.5%: male literacy is 69%, and female literacy is 51%. In Edakalinadu, 12% of the population is under 6 years of age.

Churches
Lord Jesus Christ's prayer house,Thenpakkam

Our Lady of Miracle's Church, Kadapakkam

CSI Church is recently developed in Mosque street

Events
RTI Training Programme - 14/06/2015
To register - https://www.facebook.com/events/1598582123738101/

Schools
Edaikazhinadu has a number of government and private schools, including Loyola Matriculation School,Sri. P. Krishna. Govt. Hr. Sec, School, K.V.S. Matriculation school, St. Mary's Matriculation school, and Jeevitha International Trust - all of which are situated in Kadapakkam.

Banks
Edaikazhinadu has branch of Indian Bank and Pallavan Grama Bank. Indian bank is the oldest one and all business  and common man use this bank for transactions. But the general complaint against this bank is lack of infrastructure, Slow processing, not responding to customers properly. To open a new account you need to stand for hours and yet they will ask you to come after 7–10 days.

Hospitals
This area has one primary government health care, situated in edaikazhinadu. People in this region use this hospital for all basic health problems. This hospital has 2 doctors working in shift and few supporting staffs.

Industries
A.M.E Saw mill & Furniture is a wood furniture manufacturer in this area.

This area also has some Hallow block manufacturers, fish net manufacturing company, wood furniture companies, and aqua companies.

No other source for many graduated people to survive with a job in this area.

Boat house
Rain drop boat house, situated in Muttukadu (Nainarkuppam) is a tourist spot in Edaikazhinadu. People travel between Chennai & Pondicherry visits this place frequently.

This organic farm is closed

Real estate
Due to its environment, Edaikazhinadu is a preferred destination among realty investors. Most of the beach next properties are already purchased by Chennai-based business people and realty investors.

References

Cities and towns in Chengalpattu district